Cornelius Kenneally (28 July 1926 – 18 January 1995) was an Australian cricketer. He played in two first-class matches for South Australia in 1949/50.

See also
 List of South Australian representative cricketers

References

External links
 

1926 births
1995 deaths
Australian cricketers
South Australia cricketers
Cricketers from Adelaide